The DBAG Class 641 (VT641) is a class of German railway vehicle operated by Deutsche Bahn. They are diesel railcars belonging to the Alstom Coradia A TER family. Their development started as a joint project between Deutsche Bahn and SNCF, on the one hand, and the railway vehicle manufacturers De Dietrich Ferroviaire and Linke-Hofmann-Busch on the other, both being subsidiaries of Alstom.

Forty units of this class were delivered to Deutsche Bahn, of which four have been retired due to accidents.

The railcars are fitted with centre buffer couplings. The arrangement of the two engines in front of the bogies, the bulging appearance of the coach body and the large, one-piece, swinging doors give the vehicle its characteristic appearance, which has earned it the nickname Walfisch (Whale).

They are deployed in Baden-Württemberg at Hochrhein – between Basel Badischer Bahnhof and Lauchringen – and in Thuringia at Erfurt, on lines including the Schwarzatalbahn between Rottenbach and Katzhütte, on the Pfefferminzbahn between Sömmerda and Großheringen, the Friedrichroda railway between Friedrichroda and Fröttstädt, on the line from Saalfeld to Blankenstein and the Gotha–Gräfenroda railway.

Other vehicles of the Alstom Coradia A TER family were delivered from Reichshoffen to the French SNCF and the Luxembourg CFL. These vehicles are classified by the SNCF as ATER 73500. For cross-border traffic between Germany and France a further 19 were procured as ATER 73900, of which two (73914 and 73915) were paid for by Saarland and painted traffic red.

See also
 List of Deutsche Bahn AG locomotives and railbuses
 SNCF Class X 73500
 SNCF Class X 73900
 Alstom Coradia Lint

External links
 

Alstom Coradia
641
Train-related introductions in 1999